The Caterpillar D10 is a track-type tractor manufactured by Caterpillar Inc. (then called the Caterpillar Tractor Company).  It was the first modern tractor to use the elevated drive sprocket to improve durability, operator comfort, and ease of maintenance.

History
The Caterpillar D10 was the result of a need for a tractor larger than the Caterpillar D9. At this time, competitors were building bulldozers that were more powerful than the D9. Allis Chalmers introduced at Conexpo 69 in Chicago a  HD-41 which was the largest crawler in the world. In 1974 after AC and Fiat merged their construction equipment divisions the  41-B was introduced. For example, the Fiat-Allis 41-B track-type tractor had  at the time, while the D9H had .

The first pilot D10 was D10X1 and was shown in July 1973 at a big Caterpillar corporate meeting. Other prototypes would follow in 1975 and 1977. In March 1977, prototypes P-1 through P-10 would appear and be subsequently dispatched to different job sites. The D10 was introduced at a dealer meeting by Caterpillar in the fall of 1977. Between 1978 and 1986 nearly 1,000 D10s were made at Caterpillar's East Peoria plant. The D10 had sales of their Fiat-Allis/Komatsu competitive sized bulldozers combined. With the introduction of the N-Series tractors in 1986-87 their model numbers were pushed up. For example, the D9N replaced the D8L, the D10N replaced the D9L and the D11N replaced the D10.

The D10 was large enough to do about 50 percent more production than the D9H.

High Drive system

Among modern tractors, the High Drive (elevated sprocket) design was unique to Caterpillar products. The concept originated in 1914 with Caterpillar predecessor C. L. Best Tractor's 30 Humpback; this tractor was discontinued a year later, and the only other tractor to use the concept until the D10's introduction was the Cletrac Model F, built between 1920 and 1922. The elevated sprocket system was first applied to a 10-machine test run of the D10 in 1977.  It separated the suspension from the tractor's drive train, dramatically reducing stress on both and increasing their durability.  Prior to this, the combined system, which put the drive axle under constant strain of the vehicle's load and terrain beneath it, was prone to frequent failure.  Elevating the drive sprocket allowed for a more absorbent suspension, which provided better traction, reduced component wear and operator fatigue, and isolated the drive sprocket in a flexible section of the machine's tracks.  It also allowed for the relocation of the transmission behind and beneath the operator, providing better weight distribution and improved traction, and permitting more compact location of both the blade and rear implements. The high-drive system also eliminates the traditional geared final drive in favor of modular system employing a hydraulic planetary final drive, which withstands engine torque better, since it distributes the forces over multiple gear teeth instead of a single tooth as in the traditional system. The disadvantage is that the track moves around one more idler, reducing track life. Caterpillar claims to have alleviated this with the SALT (Sealed and Lubricated Track), a permanently lubricated track system which was introduced on their track-type tractors in the early 1970s.

Introduction
The November 1977 issue of Excavating Contractor magazine had a 2-page story on the bulldozer titled "Cat Uncorks The New D10". One of the first D10s is currently sitting in front of the East Peoria, Ill plant where it was made. A picture of this D10 can be found on pages of a book titled "The Caterpillar Century" on pages 298-297. Caterpillar put the 1,786 cid V-12 twin turbocharged D348 in the D10 to power it. This had already proven itself in the 777 off-highway hauler and the   992/992B wheel loaders from 1968 on. The early D10s came with a single big  black  exhaust stack up front. But some engine problems came up with exhaust system routing which resulted in two exhaust stacks up front to correct this problem. This new look took root in 1980. At the time Caterpillar's bulldozer lineup was the  D3,  D4E,  D5B,  D6D,  D7G,  D8K, and  D9H with the addition of the  D10.

In 1986 an even larger dozer, the   Caterpillar D11N was introduced to replace the D10.  The D11 carried on the success of the elevated drive sprocket system in large bulldozers. The currently available D10T model, and preceding D10R and D10N variants, are not the original D10's successors but the D11N, D11R and the current D11T are.

Gallery

See also
 Heavy equipment
 Caterpillar D11
 Caterpillar D9
 List of Caterpillar Inc. machines

References

External links
Caterpillar D-Series Track-Type Tractors — Official Caterpillar website
Bulldozers Guide

D10
D10
Bulldozers with powerplants larger than 500kW